Ispaster is a town and municipality located in the province of Biscay, in the autonomous community of Basque Country, northern Spain. According to the 2019 census, it has 735 inhabitants.

Prehistory
The first archaeological artifacts were found in the caves of Kobeaga II and Kobeaga I. The first, located a few kilometers away from the sea, a small group in Mesolithic dedicated to  important activity settled as fishing. This settlement, formed by a population of men who fished Mollusca, was founded around 3500 BCE, according to the investigations made by Apellaniz in 1973.
The second cave, Kobeaga I, located in the same area as the first, were used as a funeral enclosure during the Bronze Age.
In this locality are in addition other deposits without excavating, such as Otoyo'ko Jentilkoba, Jentilkoba de Iparretxe and Urtiaga. The first documented mentions of the municipality of Ispaster date from year 1334, in an order of Alfonso XI.

History
Ispaster is located in a coastal hill, alternating between low and sandy areas to cliffs. The first signs of human occupation are in diverse cavities where a small group lived on fishermen-recolectores during the Mesolithic. Others served like funeral enclosures from the Neolithic. At the beginning of the early modern period, a constructive explosion takes place that turns the municipality in Biscay's best equipped one in gothic-Renaissance popular architecture.

Events
The Grand Prix Ayuntamiento de Ispaster is held in Ispaster

See also
1980 Ispaster attack

References

External links
http://www.ispaster.net 
 ISPASTER in the Bernardo Estornés Lasa - Auñamendi Encyclopedia (Euskomedia Fundazioa) 

Municipalities in Biscay